Herb Lindsay (born November 12, 1954) is an American former long-distance runner. He competed in track, road and cross country running disciplines. He was the silver medalist in the 5000-meter run at the 1979 Pan American Games, finishing behind compatriot Matt Centrowitz. He also represented his country at the 1982 IAAF World Cross Country Championships, coming 69th overall and sixth in the team rankings.

Career
Born in Michigan, he grew up in a rural area in Grand Rapids, then Reed City. He was the youngest of six children, with three older sisters and two brothers. He attended Reed City High School and began racing there, earning high school state championships in cross country and distance track events.

After gaining a track scholarship, he competed athletically for the Michigan State Spartans and was an NCAA All-American for them in cross country in 1974 and 1976. He placed third at the 1976 NCAA Division I Men's Cross Country Championships. He was a one-time national champion, taking the 10K run American title in 1979, becoming the second man to win the title after Bill Rodgers (runner). Lindsay's winning time of 28:35 minutes remained the championship best until 1996, when it was beaten by Matt Giusto. His best national placing on the track was at the 1979 USA Outdoor Track and Field Championships, where he was third in the 5000 m. He also won a 5000 m title at the U.S. Olympic Festival in 1979 and was the 1979 runner-up at the USA Cross Country Championships behind Alberto Salazar.

On the road running circuit, Lindsay was highly successful, with his best performance being a world record of 61:47 minutes for the half marathon in Manchester, Vermont in 1981. This record stood for one day short of a year, with Michael Musyoki knocking eleven seconds of the record. During his career he won the Saint Silvester Road Race, Bolder Boulder, Fifth Third River Bank Run, the Crim 10-miler (three times) and the Cascade Run Off (twice). He was also runner-up at the Falmouth Road Race twice. He played a part in professionalization of the sport, with races between him and other top road racers such as Frank Shorter and Stan Mavis leading to the setting up of trust funds, allowing them to be paid yet retain their amateur (and thus Olympics-eligible) status.

International competitions

National titles
USA 10K Championships: 1979

Circuit wins
Saint Silvester Road Race: 1979
Bolder Boulder: 1984
Fifth Third River Bank Run: 1981
Crim Festival of Races: 1979, 1980, 1981
Cascade Run Off: 1979, 1980

References

External links

All-Athletics profile

Living people
1954 births
American male long-distance runners
Pan American Games medalists in athletics (track and field)
Athletes (track and field) at the 1979 Pan American Games
World record setters in athletics (track and field)
Michigan State Spartans men's track and field athletes
Pan American Games silver medalists for the United States
Sportspeople from Grand Rapids, Michigan
People from Reed City, Michigan
Medalists at the 1979 Pan American Games